Rockvale Academy is a coeducational boarding school located in the hill town of Kalimpong in the district of Darjeeling, West Bengal, India.  It was founded by the late Mr. B.B. Pradhan in 1984 and celebrated its silver jubilee in 2009. English is used as the medium of instruction.

Rockvale Academy is affiliated to the I.C.S.E. and I.S.C. Board, New Delhi, and offers prescribed course in Science, Arts and Commerce at the +2 level. It has classes from nursery to XII.  It is a member of the AHLIS (Association of Heads of Listed ICSE Schools of Darjeeling District) which has a strength of 28 schools from the district of Darjeeling and neighbouring Sikkim.

Rockvale opened an affiliated tertiary education institution, the B.B.Pradhan College of Management Studies, in 2003.

Students come from as far away as Bangladesh, Nepal, Bhutan and Thailand.

History 
The institution was established in 1984 by the late Mr. Bhanu Bhakta Pradhan .  He discovered a plot of land for sale in the 9th mile area of Kalimpong. His initial plan was to set up a hotel. This is apparent from the small size of some rooms in the main building. However, he was persuaded by his closest friends to set up an educational institution. . The school opened  on 11 March 1984 with just over 30 students.

The school was granted permanent affiliation to the ICSE Board in 1992 and became an examination centre in 1998. It was the first privately owned school in Kalimpong to be awarded the permanent affiliation.

The school introduced the +2 level in 1997.

In 2008, Rockvale Academy was chosen as an IELTS centre by the British Council.

The school's founder, Bhanu Bhakta Pradhan, held the post of Director of Rockvale Academy until his death in 2002.

School motto and song
The motto of the school is ‘Optima Thule’ which stands for "Aim for the Highest".

The school song is titled ‘Wings of an Eagle’. It was composed by Mr. S.Rasaily and Mr. Y. Ghatani. The Nepali version is titled ‘Gyaan Ko Batti’.  It was written by Mr. B.B. Pradhan and the tune was given by Mr. Gyan Lopchan.

ENGLISH SCHOOL SONG

Wings of an Eagle

Optima thule! Optima thule!

Oh! Rockvalites, go flying high

To touch the bright blue sky

Let’s try and try to touch the sky

Like an eagle soaring high.

Optima thule! Optima thule!

CHORUS:

Let’s go with love

Be like the dove

To spread the word of peace

In every race and every place

And bring joy to every face.

REPEAT CHORUS

Optima thule! Optima thule!(2)

Let’s spread the light

To make it bright

Every hour of night and day

Let’s and try to bring the light

To drive the darkness away

REPEAT

Optima thule! Optima thule!(2)

Oh! Rockvalites, go flying high

To touch the bright blue sky

Let’s try and try to touch the sky

Like an eagle soaring high.(3)

NEPALI SCHOOL SONG

"GYAN KO BATTI"

STAHI:

Gyan-ko  bat-ti  baa-lay-ra, ha-mi  ag-ha-ri  ba-rd-nay  chau

Bidh-ya-ko  jyoti  pau-na-lai, ha-mi  kshi-tiz-ma  poug-nay  chau

REPEAT STAHI: Gyan-ko  bat-ti  baa-lay-ra

ANTARA:

Per-na  ha-mi  lak-shya-ma  poug-nay  dhya-ya-lai  rakh-nay  chau (2)

Sam-jha-na  ham-ro  sa-kar  hu-nay  bidh-ya-lai  rakh-nay  chau (2)

Gyan-ko  bat-ti  baa-lay-ra

Bha-wishy a ham-ro  u-jya-lo  gar-nay  hey-tu-lai  li-ye-ra (2)

Ba-lak  ha-mi  bish-wa-ka  ta-ra  ek din  bann-nay  chau (2)

REPEAT STAHI AND END

Inter-house competitions
Rockvale has four houses that engage in inter-house competitions in sports such as volleyball, table tennis, basketball and badminton, as well as co-curricular activities such as elocution, debates, quizzes, spelling bee and extempore. The house that collects the most points at the end of the academic session is declared the "champion house" for that year.

Infrastructure 
Apart from the main building at 9th mile, Kalimpong, the school is constructing a Sports Complex and Rockvale International Hostel at Chiboo Busty, Kalimpong.

References

External links
 Rockvale Academy official website

Primary schools in West Bengal
High schools and secondary schools in West Bengal
Boarding schools in West Bengal
Schools in Darjeeling district
Kalimpong
Educational institutions established in 1984
1984 establishments in West Bengal